St Benedict's Catholic School is a coeducational Roman Catholic secondary school and sixth form in Bury St Edmunds, Suffolk, England. Opened in 1967, the school has around 900 students.

St Benedict's was a Mathematics and Computing Specialist School. Whilst the school is based in Bury St. Edmunds, many of its students travel from a wide area, including Haverhill, Thetford, Sudbury, Stowmarket, Newmarket and other surrounding villages and towns, because it is the only Catholic secondary school in the vicinity.

Previously a voluntary aided school administered by Suffolk County Council, in September 2022 St Benedict's Catholic School converted to academy status. The school is now sponsored by the Our Lady of Walsingham Catholic Trust, and continues to be under the jurisdiction of the Roman Catholic Diocese of East Anglia.

Ofsted
In September 2014, a snap Ofsted inspection (which were introduced after Operation Trojan Horse), was held at the school. Following the inspection, the school's previous rating of good was downgraded to "needs improvement". Inspectors found St Benedict's to be in breach of rules surrounding guarding against extremism and radicalisation, and were failing to prepare students "for life and work in modern Britain". The report was withdrawn within hours, with Ofsted stating that "quality assurance checks" were required. In November 2014, the school was one of 11 highlighted by Ofsted as failing to promote British values.

The wording of the report was later revised, with references to extremism and radicalisation removed, but the needs improvement rating was maintained. The decision to downgrade the school was criticised both by the Head teacher of the school and the Catholic Education Service. An interim inspection then took place in January 2015, and Ofsted wrote to the school to confirm "the school has made progress in key areas since the inspection." Later that month the school was ranked second in the West Suffolk league table, with Head Teacher Hugh O'Neill stating,  "The results vindicate the work we do here. I think you will find that there is a disparity between schools' Ofsted ratings and their position in the league table across the county."

The school was graded as Outstanding or Good in all areas in its most recent Ofsted inspection carried out in September 2016.

Curriculum
The school follows the National Curriculum and offers a range of subjects at GCSE and A-Level. As a Catholic school, Religious Education is taught from that standpoint and is compulsory at GCSE. Sixth form students who study 3 A Levels are obliged to take a course known as "General Religious Education", which involves no examinations or certificates yet is mandatory.

The school offers a sixth form for students over the age of 16, covering Year 12s and Year 13s. The Sixth Form is highly successful and has a strong track record offering a range of 'facilitating' and 'keystone' subjects at A level. The school has enjoyed long-standing success in supporting students with securing places at Oxford and Cambridge universities as well as medicine and dentistry. Around 150 students study in the Sixth Form.

References

External links
 School website
 Ofsted reports

Catholic secondary schools in the Diocese of East Anglia
Secondary schools in Suffolk
Educational institutions established in 1967
1967 establishments in England
Academies in Suffolk
Bury St Edmunds